Susan Helen Heon (born May 31, 1962), later known by her married name Susan Preston, is an American former competition swimmer who represented the United States at the 1984 Summer Olympics in Los Angeles, California.  She finished fourth in the final event of the women's 400-meter individual medley.

References

1962 births
Living people
American female medley swimmers
Olympic swimmers of the United States
Sportspeople from Summit, New Jersey
Pittsburgh Panthers women's swimmers
Swimmers at the 1984 Summer Olympics
20th-century American women